The Chipping Barnet War Memorial is located immediately west of St John the Baptist Church in Wood Street, Chipping Barnet, Greater London. It commemorates the men of the district who died in the first and second World Wars and is in the form of an octagonal base below a pedestal surmounted by a tapering column with a Celtic cross head. The cross is intersected by a corona in a flattened octagonal section. It was unveiled by Lord Byng of Vimy in April 1921. Byng was born at nearby Wrotham Park in Hertfordshire.

References

External links

http://www.londonremembers.com/memorials/barnet-war-memorial
https://www.warmemorialsonline.org.uk/node/207820

World War I memorials in England
Chipping Barnet
World War II memorials in England
Buildings and structures completed in 1921
1921 in London
Military memorials in London
Wood Street, Chipping Barnet